John Carlo de Vera (born March 10, 1986), better known by his screen name JC de Vera,   is a Filipino actor, host, model, and singer.

Personal life
De Vera was offered a basketball scholarship in Colegio de San Juan de Letran after he graduated from high school in Colegio San Agustin - Makati but rejected it to pursue his acting career. He also studied in Ateneo de Manila University. De Vera announced on February 28, 2021, in the YouTube channel of Erich Gonzales that he and his non-showbiz partner Rikkah Cruz were married since 2018.

Career

2003–2010
He started his showbiz career in 2003 when he was cast in Click. At the time, he was paired up with Valerie Concepcion and Julianne Lee, but was soon was cast in supporting and lead roles in primetime series with the likes of Richard Gutierrez, Dingdong Dantes, Dennis Trillo.

He was named as GMA Network's Drama Prince after they highly rated and praised Philippine dramas like Pati Ba Pintig ng Puso, Pasan Ko Ang Daigdig and Babangon Ako't Dudurugin Kita, where he was paired with Yasmien Kurdi. JC has also paired up with Rhian Ramos in LaLola and Heart Evangelista in Sine Novela's Ngayon at Kailanman. JC was paired up with Jackie Rice in the recently concluded fantaserye of GMA Network, Panday Kids.

2010–2013
De Vera was transferred to TV5 and signed a three-year contract. He was formally introduced on March 17, 2010, as one of the new talents to the network. His last appearance was Cassandra: Warrior Angel.

In December 2010, de Vera announced his departure from Bench following his decision not to renew his contract due to busy commitments, but he moved to Calvin Klein and Freego Jeans in August 2011.

2013–present
After signing a two-year contract with ABS-CBN on July 29, 2013, De Vera's career returned to the limelight as he starred on the high-profile primetime series The Legal Wife starring Angel Locsin, Jericho Rosales and Maja Salvador, the afternoon series Moon of Desire starring Meg Imperial and Ellen Adarna, and in the film Once a Princess with Erich Gonzales and Enchong Dee. Soon after, he appeared in the 40th Metro Manila Film Festival movie Shake, Rattle & Roll XV, alongside Erich Gonzales.

In 2015, he starred in the romantic horror film Halik sa Hangin with Julia Montes and Gerald Anderson. He was seen next together with Jessy Mendiola in the romantic family drama series You're My Home, alongside Richard Gomez and Dawn Zulueta. He starred in the teleserye, The Better Half, as Rafael Cabrera, in 2017.

In 2018, he starred in the romantic comedy series Since I Found You with Arci Muñoz and Piolo Pascual.

Filmography

Talk shows

Television series

Variety shows

Movies

Accolades
 This is a list of awards, nominations, recognitions and achievements received by JC de Vera during his career.

References

External links

1986 births
Living people
Filipino male child actors
Filipino male television actors
Filipino male models
People from Parañaque
People from Manila
Male actors from Metro Manila
GMA Network personalities
TV5 (Philippine TV network) personalities
Star Magic
ABS-CBN personalities
Viva Artists Agency
Filipino male film actors
Filipino male comedians